She Spies is an action-adventure television show that ran from July 20, 2002 until May 17, 2004 in two seasons. The show was sold into syndication but the first four episodes were premiered on the NBC network, whose syndication arm was one of the producers. Disappointing ratings during the show's second season led to its cancellation after season two ended. She Spies bore noticeable production and direction similarities with Charlie's Angels.

Plot
Three female convicted felons who were incarcerated for electronic crimes ("DD"), confidence tricks ("Cassie") and battery ("Shane") are paroled from prison in exchange for work as secret operatives for the US government under 'ComCent', a branch of the ISD. In addition, they have to answer to a special agent in charge of the success of their operations and of making sure that the terms of their conditional release are consistently followed.

Cast
 Natasha Henstridge as Cassie McBaine
 Kristen Miller as Deedra "D.D." Cummings
 Natashia Williams as Shane Phillips
 Carlos Jacott as Jack Wilde 
 Jamie Iglehart as Duncan Baleu 
 Cameron Daddo as Quentin Cross

Production
The show was produced by NBC Enterprises and MGM Worldwide Television Group, and during development was under the title of B.A.I.T.

Writing
She Spies had very strong comic and chick flick elements which in many instances proved even more relevant to the storytelling than the spy-related situations and gadgets themselves. The type of humor changed markedly from season one to season two, with the former containing much self-referential humor and breaking of the "fourth wall", while both these elements were removed in season two.

Casting and production
Natasha Henstridge who played Cassie wasn't keen to sign up for the show as she was not interested in the same old "three spies" story, but the makers convinced her that the show would be planned as a spoof, have many comedy elements and no drama like Charlie's Angels.

The women used martial arts and hand-to-hand combat as fighting skills. No guns were used as weapons.

Episodes

Home media
She Spies: The Complete First Season was released on March 14, 2006, by MGM Home Entertainment in a 4-DVD set.

References

External links
 

2002 American television series debuts
2004 American television series endings
NBC original programming
Espionage television series
First-run syndicated television programs in the United States
Television series by MGM Television
Television shows set in Los Angeles
Television shows set in Newport Beach, California
American action adventure television series
American spy comedy television series